Surke Thaili Khai (English: Where is the Tied-Pouch) or Surke Thaili is a Nepalese song by Rajan Raj Shiwakoti, Anju Panta, Raju Biswokarma, released on August 6, 2015. It was a single from soundtrack album Woda Number 6 (2015). The song was produced by Deepak Raj Giri, Kedar Ghimire, Deepa Shree Niraula and Jeetu Nepal. It is the second most viewed Nepalese song in YouTube currently viewing over 24 million. In the music video of the track features actors including Deepak Raj Giri, Priyanka Karki, Dipa Shree Niraula, Kedar Ghimire, Sitaram Kattel and Dayahang Rai.

Background 
Surke Thaili Khai is a song from Nepalese movie Woda Number 6. The song is sung by popular/rising Nepalese singers Anju Panta, Rajan Raj Shiwakoti and Raju Biswokarma. The song is written and composed by Rajan Raj Shiwakoti.

Music Video 
The music was released in video sharing website YouTube on August 6, 2015. The music video features popular actors from Nepal including Deepak Raj Giri, Priyanka Karki, Dipa Shree Niraula, Kedar Ghimire, Sitaram Kattel and Dayahang Rai, the music video follows the love story of these actors from the movie Woda Number 6 and they are in a Mela. It was the first Nepalese song to get 20 million views in video sharing website YouTube.

Track listing

Awards

Credits and personnel 
Original version
 Rajan Raj Shiwakoti, Anju Panta, Raju Biswokarma - Singers
 Rajan Raj Shiwakoti - Lyrics and Music
 Shankar B.C. - Choreographer
 Gautam Raj Khadka - Editor
 Deepak Bajracharya, Maan Krishna Shrestha - Cameramen
 Ujwal Ghimire - Director

References 

Nepalese songs
2015 songs
Nepali-language songs